This is a list of people from Hays, Kansas, United States.

Academia

 Maurice L. Albertson (1918-2009), civil engineer, professor, Peace Corps co-founder

Arts and entertainment

Film, television, and theatre
 Robert Bogue (1964- ), actor
 Buffalo Bill Cody (1846-1917), showman, frontiersman, scout
 Rebecca Staab (1961- ), actress

Folklore
 Elizabeth Polly ( -1867), the so-called "Blue Light Lady"

Journalism
 John L. Allen Jr. (1965- ), reporter, editor, analyst
 Melissa McDermott, news anchor

Literature
 Elizabeth Bacon Custer (1842-1933), writer

Music
 Rob Beckley (1975- ), musician
 Petrowitsch Bissing (1871-1961), violin instructor

Other visual arts
 Hart Wood (1880-1957), architect

Business
 Philip Anschutz (1939- ), business magnate

Crime and law enforcement
 Clay Allison (1840-1887), gunfighter
 Robert Courtney (1952- ), fraudster, pharmacist
 Wild Bill Hickok (1837-1876), gunfighter, lawman

Military

 Calamity Jane (1852-1903), frontierswoman, scout
 George Custer (1839-1876), U.S. Army Bvt. Maj. General

Politics

National
 Jerry Moran (1954- ), U.S. Senator from Kansas
 Kathryn O'Loughlin McCarthy (1894-1952), U.S. Representative from Kansas
 Frances Tilton Weaver (1904-2003), feminist legal pioneer

State
 Jeff Colyer (1960- ), 47th Governor of Kansas
 Travis Couture-Lovelady, Kansas state legislator
 Eber Phelps (1951- ), Kansas state legislator

Sports

American football
 Tysyn Hartman (1989- ), safety
 Tony Leiker (1964- ), defensive end

Baseball
 Otto Denning (1912-1992), catcher, first baseman, manager
 Elon Hogsett (1903-2001), pitcher
 Willard Schmidt (1928-2007), pitcher

Basketball
 Ron Baker (1993- ), shooting guard with the New York Knicks (born in Hays, but grew up in Utica and Scott City)
 Marlies Gipson (1987- ), forward

Other
 Dave Armstrong (1957- ), announcer
 Bob Davis (1945- ), sportscaster

See also

 List of people from Ellis County, Kansas
 List of Fort Hays State University people
 Lists of people from Kansas

References

Hays, Kansas
Hays